Ezra Weisz is an American voice actor and ADR director who stars in various anime television shows.

Career
Weisz is a prolific voice actor in the anime community, having done voices in various anime shows such as Outlaw Star, The Big O, Rave Master, and Scryed. He is also well known for his past voice work in Saban live-action shows.

Some of his better known-roles there included Mantix (who was one of the dreaded Mantrons) in Beetleborgs Metallix, as well as Falkar (who was one of the three Fallen Angel, or Troika, demons) in Power Rangers: Lightspeed Rescue, and also the male voice of the Org General named Mandilok in Power Rangers: Wild Force (which was the last Power Rangers series to be filmed in America before it moved to New Zealand in 2003; the move laid off much of the original PR crew, including Weisz). Since then, his main focus has been anime. He co-directed the ADR for Bobobo-bo Bo-bobo alongside another voice actor, Michael Sorich. He is also the live-audience coach for Disney Channel shows, helping the teen and kid stars with them with improvisation on the set.

Personal life 
Since 1998, Weisz is married to Sabrina Hill. They have two children.

Filmography

Anime

 Arc the Lad – Clive
 Aldnoah.Zero – Soma Yagarai
 The Big O – Preview Narrator, Phil (Ep. 16)
 Blade of the Immortal – Kagehisa Anotsu
 BlazBlue Alter Memory – Nago 
 Bleach – Yylfordt Granz
 Code Geass: Lelouch of the Rebellion – Mao
 Di Gi Charat – Takuro Kimura
 Fushigi Yûgi – Kouji
 Gad Guard – Takenaka
 Gankutsuou: The Count of Monte Cristo – Baron Franz D'Épinay
 Ghost in the Shell: Stand Alone Complex – Guru Guru
 Green Green – Hikaru Ichiban-Boshi
 Heat Guy J – Mitchal Rubinstein
 JoJo's Bizarre Adventure: Golden Wind – Pannacotta Fugo
 Hunter × Hunter 2011 series – Wing
 Kanokon – Tayura Minamoto
 Magi: The Kingdom of Magic – Ren Koumei
 Magic Knight Rayearth – Kakeru Shido, Umi's Father
 Mazinkaiser SKL – Ken Kaido
 Naruto – Kikunojou
 Naruto Shippuden – Suname, Nurari
 New Getter Robo – Debt Collector
 Outlaw Star – Fred Luo, Gene Starwind (Young)
 Planetes – Gennojo (Ep. 6)
 Rave Master – Schneider
 Rurouni Kenshin – Mr. Santou, Seiku Arai, Traveler
 Samurai Champloo – Hishikawa Moronobu
 Scryed – Grow
 A Little Snow Fairy Sugar – Basil, Turmeric
 Sword Art Online: Alicization – Eldrie Synthesis Thirty-One
 Tenjho Tenge – Fu Chen
 Ultra Maniac – Host Father, Sebastian
 Vampire Knight series – Kaname Kuran
 X – Yūto Kigai
 Zenki – Mango

Animation
 Popples – Gruffman, Coach Loudly
 Miraculous: Tales of Ladybug and Cat Noir – Fred Haprele, Adrien's Bodyguard/Gorilla, Simon Grimault, Théo Barbot (Season 2), André, The Ice Cream maker (2015–Present) (Note: Weisz is also the English Dub director for the show)

Films
 Akira – Additional Voices (Animaze dub)
 Hunter × Hunter: The Last Mission – Wing
 Lu over the Wall – Teruo
 Miss Hokusai – Zenjirō Ikeda
 Paprika – Him (Konakawa's friend)
 Winx Club 3D:Magical Adventure – King Oritel

Live action
 Adventures in Voice Acting – Himself
 Beetleborgs Metallix – Changeling, Mantix (voices, credited as Ethan Murray)
 Big Bad Beetleborgs – Lottamuggs, Cyber-Serpent (voices), Green Cannon Machine (2nd voice)
 Masked Rider – Reptosect, Brain Mite (voices)
 Power Rangers in Space – Fearog, Body Switcher, Destructoid (as Ethan Murray), Lizwizard (voices, uncredited)
 Power Rangers: Lightspeed Rescue – Falkar, Troika (voices)
 Power Rangers: Lost Galaxy – Wisewizard (voice, uncredited)
 Power Rangers: Time Force – Tentaclaw (voice)
 Power Rangers: Turbo – Mouthpiece, Numbor, Lord Litter (voices, uncredited)
 Power Rangers: Wild Force – Mandilok (male voice)
 Power Rangers: Zeo – Leaky Faucet, Admiral Abominator (voices, uncredited)
 VR Troopers – Silkoid, Duplitronic (voices)

Video Games
 Pokémon Masters - Molayne
 Star Ocean: First Departure – Ioshua Jerand

Production credits

Voice director
 86
B: The Beginning
 Bobobo-bo Bo-bobo 
 Bottle Fairy 
 The Jungle Bunch
 Legend of the Millennium Dragon 
 A Little Snow Fairy Sugar
 ‘’Megalobox’’ 
 Miraculous: Tales of Ladybug and Cat Noir
 Nanga Parbat (2010) 
 Paprika 
 Popples
 Radiata Stories 
 The Sky Crawlers
 Ultra Maniac
 Wild Arms XF
 Zak Storm

References

External links 
  – Ezra Weisz and Jay Kasten
 
 

20th-century American male actors
21st-century American male actors
20th-century American Jews
American male video game actors
American male voice actors
American voice directors
Living people
Rutgers University alumni
21st-century American Jews
Year of birth missing (living people)